EasyHotel (styled as easyHotel) is an international hotel chain, headquartered in London with 44 branches in eleven European countries.

History

 
Originally founded by Stelios Haji-Ioannou through the easyGroup, easyHotel was incorporated in 2004 and opened its first hotel in South Kensington, London in 2005. Whilst easyHotel owned its first hotel in South Kensington (which was subsequently sold and franchised in 2007), its growth strategy in its early years was to expand via franchise contracts.. Stelios stayed in the very first branded easyHotel property on its opening night on the 1st August 2005. The first week the South Kensington property was open, it was fully booked.  

In 2007, easyHotel also signed a master franchise agreement with Germany-based i.gen Hotels, planning 60 franchised easyHotels in Europe (outside the UK) in three years, of which about 10 were expected in Germany.

In 2010, the brand opened its first hotel in Germany, the twelfth easyHotel overall.   After the success of their Berlin property, another easyHotel opened in the city centre of Frankfurt in 2015.

In June 2014, the Company floated on the London Stock Exchange raising £24.5 million to fund further growth and expansion. In August 2019, directors of the company backed a £139 million bid for the company despite opposition from founder Sir Stelios Haji-Ioannou. The bidding consortium was made up of Luxembourg-based ICAMAP and Ivanhoé Cambridge of Canada. Ivanhoe is owned by Quebec’s pension company, CDPQ (Caisse de depot et placement du Quebec). As of 2021, ICAMAP and Ivanhoé Cambridge now own 76 percent of stakes in the company. The majority owners also announced to invest € 50 million to vastly expand the chains operations by 2026 throughout Europe and the UK.

In December 2021, Karim Malak was appointed CEO after the sudden death of François Bachetta at the age of 56 in the June of the same year. In October 2022, easyHotel acquired eight franchised easyHotel properties in the BENELUX region (7 in The Netherlands (Amsterdam, Zaandam, Maastricht, Rotterdam, The Hague) and 1 in Brussels, Belgium) from Crossroads Real Estate for € 145 million.  

As of January 2023, with the opening of their most recent owned hotel, easyHotel Dublin City Centre, easyHotel has 25 owned and leased easyHotel properties and 19  franchised easyHotel properties.

Operations
As of October 2022, easyHotel has corporately owned and franchised branches in the United Kingdom (21, of which 7 are in London), the Netherlands (7), Switzerland (4), Germany (2), France (2), Spain (3), Belgium (1), Ireland (1) Hungary (1), Portugal (1) and Bulgaria (1). The formerly operated sole hotel in Dubai no longer exists.

References

External links

 

easyGroup
Hotel and leisure companies based in London
Hotel chains
Hotel chains in the United Kingdom